The Turku Ring Road (Finnish: Turun kehätie, Swedish: Åbo ringväg) or Finnish National Road 40 (Finnish: Kantatie 40, Swedish: Stamväg 40) is a ring road of Turku, Finland. It leads from Naantali to Piikkiö in Kaarina, passing by Raisio, Turku, and Lieto.

Overview
The Turku Ring Road has businesses and markets alongside, including Biltema, IKEA, the Mylly shopping mall, and several other retail parks. Turku Ring Road is connected to Turku Airport via European route E63 to Tampere, and is part of  European route E18 from Naantali and Turku to Helsinki.

See also
Highways in Finland

External links

Roads in Finland
Transport in Turku
Ring roads in Finland